{{DISPLAYTITLE:C15H24}}
The molecular formula C15H24 (molar mass : 204.35 g/mol) may refer to:

Sesquiterpene

monocyclic
 Bergamotene
 Bisabolene
 Capnellene
 Cedrene
 Copaene
 Cubebene
 Elemene
 Germacrene
 Humulene
 Isocomene
 Longifolene
 Zingiberene

bicyclic
 Amorpha-4,11-diene
 Aristolochene
 Cadinene
 Caryophyllene
 Guaiene
 Selinene
 Thujopsene
 Valencene

other
 Farnesene